Brânză de burduf (also known as "Brânză frământată") is a salty type of Romanian cheese, made with sheep (or occasionally buffalo) milk. It has a strong flavour and slightly soft in texture.

Processing
To obtain it, sweet caş is cut into small pieces, salted and then hand-mixed in a large wooden bowl. The mixture is then placed in a sheep's stomach, or into a sheep's skin that has been carefully cleaned and sawed on the edges, or in a tube made of pine bark. The cheese can be consumed even if kept for a long time in a sheep's stomach or in a sheep's skin. If kept in pine bark, the cheese gets a specific pine resin flavour. 

The cheese is specific to different areas from the historical regions of Transylvania, Moldavia and Wallachia (including assortments known as: "Brânză în coajă de brad" (Cheese in fir shell), "Brânză de putină", "Cremă Focșani", "Brânză Moldova", "Brânză Dorna", "Brânză Luduș", "Brânză Bistrița", "Brânză Săveni" or "Brânză Botoșana").

See also
Brânză
List of cheeses

Notes and references 

Sheep's-milk cheeses
Romanian cheeses